Piet van der Sluijs (17 September 1918 – 6 November 1990) was a Dutch footballer. He played in three matches for the Netherlands national football team from 1949 to 1950.

References

External links
 

1918 births
1990 deaths
Dutch footballers
Netherlands international footballers
Place of birth missing
Association footballers not categorized by position